In mathematics, the cake number, denoted by Cn, is the maximum of the number of regions into which a 3-dimensional cube can be partitioned by exactly n planes. The cake number is so-called because one may imagine each partition of the cube by a plane as a slice made by a knife through a cube-shaped cake. It is the 3D analogue of the lazy caterer's sequence.

General formula 

If n! denotes the factorial, and we denote the binomial coefficients by

and we assume that n planes are available to partition the cube, then the n-th cake number is:

Properties
The only cake number which is prime is 2, since it requires  to have prime factorisation  where  is some prime.

The cake numbers are the 3-dimensional analogue of the 2-dimensional lazy caterer's sequence. The difference between successive cake numbers also gives the lazy caterer's sequence.

The fourth column of Bernoulli's triangle (k = 3) gives the cake numbers for n cuts, where n ≥ 3.

The sequence can be alternatively derived from the sum of up to the first 4 terms of each row of Pascal's triangle:
{| class="wikitable" style="text-align:right;"
!  !! 0 !! 1 !! 2 !! 3
! rowspan="11" style="padding:0;"| !! Sum
|-
! style="text-align:left;"|1
| 1 || — ||  — ||  — ||   1
|-
! style="text-align:left;"|2
| 1 || 1 ||  — ||  — ||   2
|-
! style="text-align:left;"|3
| 1 || 2 ||  1 ||  — ||   4
|-
! style="text-align:left;"|4
| 1 || 3 ||  3 ||  1 ||   8
|-
! style="text-align:left;"|5
| 1 || 4 ||  6 ||  4 ||  15
|-
! style="text-align:left;"|6
| 1 || 5 || 10 || 10 ||  26
|-
! style="text-align:left;"|7
| 1 || 6 || 15 || 20 ||  42
|-
! style="text-align:left;"|8
| 1 || 7 || 21 || 35 ||  64
|-
! style="text-align:left;"|9
| 1 || 8 || 28 || 56 ||  93
|-
! style="text-align:left;"|10
| 1 || 9 || 36 || 84 || 130
|}

References

External links

Mathematical optimization